Macarostola eugeniella is a moth of the family Gracillariidae. It is known from Madagascar, Mauritius and Réunion.

The larvae feed on Syzygium cumini and Syzygium jambos (Myrtaceae). They mine the leaves of their host plant.

References

Macarostola
Moths of Madagascar
Moths of Africa
Moths described in 1951